This is a list chronicling the history of professional wrestling at the Tokyo Dome. The Tokyo Dome stadium in Bunkyo, Tokyo, Japan has hosted a number of professional wrestling supercard events over the years. These events often air on pay-per-view (PPV) or are recorded for a future television broadcast. New Japan Pro-Wrestling (NJPW) is the promotion which has held the most shows at the Tokyo Dome, including the very first professional wrestling event in the Dome – Battle Satellite in Tokyo Dome on April 24, 1989. NJPW also holds their annual January 4 Tokyo Dome Show event, currently promoted under the Wrestle Kingdom name – Wrestle Kingdom is considered NJPW's biggest show of the year, their version of WrestleMania. The first January 4 show, Super Warriors in Tokyo Dome, took place in 1992 and has been held each year since then. With night two of Wrestle Kingdom 15, NJPW has held a total of 55 shows in the Tokyo Dome.

The Tokyo Dome was the site of the only NJPW, All Japan Pro Wrestling (AJPW), and World Wrestling Federation (WWF, now WWE) co-promoted show, the Wrestling Summit held on April 13, 1990. WWE participated in two additional Tokyo Dome events, co-promoting WrestleFest and SuperWrestle with Super World of Sports (SWS) in 1991. Including the Wrestling Summit, AJPW has been involved in six Dome shows, currently holding the record for the second highest amount of Tokyo Dome wrestling events. Pro Wrestling Noah (NOAH), All Japan Women's Pro-Wrestling (AJW), DDT Pro-Wrestling (DDT), Jd', the Universal Wrestling Federation (UWF) and its successor the Union of Wrestling Forces International (UWF-i), Pro Wrestling Fujiwara Gumi (PWFG), Big Japan Pro Wrestling (BJW), World Championship Wrestling (WCW), and the Universal Fighting-Arts Organization (UFO) have all also held events at the Tokyo Dome. Many Tokyo Dome events are collaborative efforts that feature wrestlers from multiple promotions; Weekly Pro Wrestling magazine's Bridge of Dreams event featured the participation of thirteen professional wrestling and mixed martial arts promotions and AJW's Big Egg Wrestling Universe event featured the participation of every major joshi promotion in Japan. 

NJPW wrestler Hiroshi Tanahashi has worked eleven main event matches at the Tokyo Dome, the most of any wrestler. This is followed by Shinya Hashimoto, Keiji Mutoh, and Shinsuke Nakamura , Kazuchika Okada (tied at eight).

Dates and events

Footnotes

References

All Japan Pro Wrestling
Big Japan Pro Wrestling shows
DDT Pro-Wrestling shows
New Japan Pro-Wrestling shows
Pro Wrestling Noah
Professional wrestling in Tokyo
World Championship Wrestling shows
WWE shows
Professional wrestling-related lists
January 4 Tokyo Dome Show